David Olmsted (May 5, 1822 – February 2, 1861) was the fourth mayor of St. Paul, Minnesota and first president of the Minnesota Territorial Council. He was a Democrat.

Career
He was born in Fairfax, Vermont, and spent many years as a trader with the Winnebago Indians near Fort Atkinson, Iowa, and at Long Prairie, Minnesota, in 1848 before settling in St. Paul in 1853. Olmsted served in the first Iowa Constitutional Convention of 1846; he then served in the Minnesota Territorial Legislature in the Minnesota Territorial Council in 1849 and 1851. He also edited the Minnesota Democrat, a frontier newspaper. After the city's charter was written in 1854, he was elected the city's first mayor and served one term. He was replaced by Alexander Ramsey. His wife was named Stevens, they had two children. He left Minnesota because of failing health, dying at his mother's house in Vermont.

Minnesota Territorial Council 
The 1st Minnesota Territorial Legislature convened on September 3, 1849. The first act of business for the Territorial Council was to select a president pro tempore. Samuel Burkleo was elected on Olmsted's motion.

The following day, Olmsted received 5 votes out of 9 to be elected the permanent president of the Council. He recited the first recorded address to the Minnesota Territorial Council:

The following day, committees were appointed. Olmsted, as president, would serve on none during his first term.

Legacy
Olmsted County, Minnesota, is named in his honor.

References

External links
Biography

1822 births
1861 deaths
People from Fairfax, Vermont
Editors of Minnesota newspapers
Members of the Minnesota Territorial Legislature
Mayors of Saint Paul, Minnesota
19th-century American politicians
Olmsted County, Minnesota